The Trinkhalle (pump house) in the Kurhaus spa complex in Baden-Baden, Germany  was built 1839–42 by Heinrich Hübsch in a complementary architectural style as the spa's main building. The 90-metre arcade is lined with frescos and benches.  The spa waters are said to have curative powers.

Motifs of the frescos 
The frescoes by Jakob Götzenberger are listed in the order from left (south) to right (north). Image title and text come from the board that is attached under the respective image.

Notes

References
 MacLachlan, Gordon. (2004).  The Rough Guide to Germany. New York: Rough Guides. 
 Schulte-Peevers, Andrea, Anthony Haywood, Jeremy Gray, Sarah Johnstone and Daniel Robinson. (2007).  Germany. Footscray, Victoria: Lonely Planet.

External links

 Baden-Baden official website

Buildings and structures in Baden-Baden
Buildings and structures completed in 1842
Heritage sites in Baden-Württemberg